Neoregelia abendrothae is a species of flowering plant of plant in the genus Neoregelia. This species is endemic to Brazil.

Cultivars
 Neoregelia 'Purple Princess'

References

BSI Cultivar Registry Retrieved 11 October 2009

abendrothae
Flora of Brazil